Thomas Anderson was a Scottish professional footballer who played as a forward.

Career
Anderson played for Bathgate and Bradford City. For Bradford City, he made 12 appearances in the Football League.

Sources

References

1897 births
Year of death missing
Scottish footballers
Bathgate F.C. players
Bradford City A.F.C. players
English Football League players
Association football forwards